The 1977 Rothmans Canadian Open was a tennis tournament played on outdoor clay courts at the National Tennis Centre in Toronto in Canada that was part of the 1977 Colgate-Palmolive Grand Prix and of the 1977 WTA Tour. The tournament was held from August 15 through August 22, 1977.

Finals

Men's singles
 Jeff Borowiak defeated  Jaime Fillol 6–0, 6–1
 It was Borowiak's 3rd title of the year and the 8th of his career.

Women's singles
 Regina Maršíková defeated  Marise Kruger 6–4, 4–6, 6–2
 It was Maršíková's 1st title of the year and the 1st of her career.

Men's doubles
 Bob Hewitt /  Raúl Ramírez defeated  Fred McNair /  Sherwood Stewart 6–4, 3–6, 6–2
 It was Hewitt's 10th title of the year and the 40th of his career. It was Ramírez's 6th title of the year and the 53rd of his career.

Women's doubles
 Delina Ann Boshoff /  Ilana Kloss defeated  Rosemary Casals /  Evonne Goolagong Cawley 6–2, 6–3
 It was Boshoff's 1st title of the year and the 1st of her career. It was Kloss' 1st title of the year and the 1st of her career.

References

External links
 
 ATP tournament profile
 WTA tournament profile

Rothmans Canadian Open
Rothmans Canadian Open
Rothmans Canadian Open
Rothmans Canadian Open
Canadian Open (tennis)